"Lay Low" is a song written by Ross Copperman, Tony Martin and Mark Nesler, and recorded by American country music artist Josh Turner. It was released in September 2014 as the lead-off single from Turner's sixth studio album Deep South, which was released much later, in 2017.

Content
"Lay Low" is a ballad in which the narrator praises the simple things that make life worthwhile, longing for a simple place of peace and quiet.

Critical reception
Taste of Country's Carrie Horton awarded the song with the "Taste of Country Critic's Pick" saying that "with honest lyrics and a perfectly straightforward melody, ‘Lay Low’ touches on all the things that make fans love country music".

Music video
The music video was directed by Trey Fanjoy and premiered in November 2014.

Chart performance
The song has sold 116,000 copies in the US as of April 2015.

Year-end charts

References

2014 singles
Josh Turner songs
Song recordings produced by Frank Rogers (record producer)
Songs written by Tony Martin (songwriter)
Songs written by Mark Nesler
Songs written by Ross Copperman
MCA Nashville Records singles
Music videos directed by Trey Fanjoy
2014 songs